Gedalya or Gedalyah may refer to:

 Gedaliah or Gedalya, Jewish governor of Yehud province under Nebuchadnezzar II of Babylon
 Gedalya Gal (born 1933), Israeli farmer and former politician
 Gedalya Dov Schwartz (1925–2020), American-born Orthodox rabbi, author, and legal jurist
 Gedalya Schorr (1910–1979), American rabbi
 Gedalya Silverstone (1871–1944), American rabbi
 Gedalya Sofer, flight engineer on El Al Flight 1862 that crashed in 1992
 Fast of Gedalia (Tzom Gedalya), a minor Jewish fast day

See also
 Gedaliah (name)